Katherine Lowe (born 2 August 1975) is an English former cricketer who played as a right-handed batter. She appeared in 3 Test matches and 8 One Day Internationals for England between 1999 and 2002. She played domestic cricket for East Midlands and Nottinghamshire.

References

External links
 
 

1975 births
Living people
Cricketers from Nottingham
England women Test cricketers
England women One Day International cricketers
East Midlands women cricketers
Nottinghamshire women cricketers